Peter Schwartz (born 1946) is an American futurist, business executive, innovator, author, and co-founder of the Global Business Network (GBN), a corporate strategy firm, specializing in future-think and scenario planning. In 2011, Schwartz became an executive at Salesforce.com, where his roles include Senior Vice President of Strategic Planning and Chief Futures Officer.

Personal history
Schwartz was born in 1946 to Klara and Benjamin Schwartz, Hungarian Jews who had been in concentration camps and were living in a displaced persons camp in Stuttgart, Germany. The family soon moved to Norway, where they lived until he was five. At this point, they emigrated to America as stateless aliens on the S/S Stavangarfjord, arriving at the Port of New York in April 1951 and like nearly all displaced persons were taken to Ellis Island. They found a new home in Haddon Township in Camden County, New Jersey, and Schwartz graduated from Haddonfield Memorial High School in 1964, where he won a National Merit scholarship, and was able to attend Rensselaer Polytechnic Institute (RPI) on full scholarship. He served as RPI's May commencement speaker for the class of 2009.

According to Stewart Brand, Schwartz was a member of Students for a Democratic Society.  After graduating in 1968 with a B.S. in aeronautical engineering, Schwartz taught high school in Philadelphia and worked in the innovative student housing program at UC Davis. In 1970 Schwartz married his first wife, Frances Michener (Funtz), a native Berkeleyan, mountaineer and his first “Remarkable Person”.   In 1972 he became an employee at the Stanford Research Institute (SRI), where he began to develop his unique method of scenario planning, and rose to director of the Strategic Environment Center. In 1982, he moved to London to work for Royal Dutch Shell as head of scenario planning. In 1985, while giving a speech at the Lawrence Berkeley Laboratory of UC Berkeley, he met his future wife, Cathleen Gross. He moved to live with her in Berkeley, California, in 1987. They married and had one child, Benjamin "Books" Schwartz, born in 1990.

Writings
Schwartz has written several books, on a variety of future-oriented topics. 
 His first book, The Art of the Long View (Doubleday, 1991) is considered by many to be the seminal publication on scenario planning. It was voted the best all time book on the future by the Association of Professional Futurists and is used as a textbook by many business schools.
Inevitable Surprises (Gotham, 2003) is a look at the forces at play in today's world, and how they will continue to affect the world. 
He also wrote The Long Boom (Perseus, 1999) with co-authors Peter Leyden and Joel Hyatt, which is a book about the future of the global economy.  
His book When Good Companies Do Bad Things (Wiley, 1999), is an argument for corporate responsibility in an age of corruption. 
China's Futures (Jossey-Bass, 2001), is a vision of several different potential futures for China. 
He also co-authored with Doug Randall the Pentagon's An Abrupt Climate Change Scenario and Its Implications for United States National Security.

He has also worked as a consultant on several movies, including Minority Report, Deep Impact, Sneakers, and WarGames. He serves on the board of directors for the Long Now Foundation. He also serves in the boards of the Center for a New American Security (CNAS) and the Asia Internet Coalition In 2007, Schwartz moderated a forum titled "The Impact of Web 2.0 and Emerging Social Network Models" as part of the World Economic Forum in Davos. He serves on the Research Innovation and Enterprise Council of Singapore and in 2014 was appointed an International Distinguished Fellow of the Prime Minister's Office. He was also voted into the Futurists hall of fame by the Association of Professional Futurists in 2012. Additionally, Schwartz is also a member of the Berggruen Institute's 21st Century Council.

Global Business Network

Schwartz founded the Global Business Network (GBN) in 1988 in his Berkeley basement with several close friends including Napier Collyns, Jay Ogilvy and Stewart Brand. Schwartz called GBN an “information hunting and gathering company”, and describes it as a high level networking and corporate research agency. In 2001, it was bought by premier strategy consulting firm the Monitor Group, although it continued to operate as a distinct entity. The Monitor Group was acquired by Deloitte in 2013 which elected to shut down GBN.

He left the company in October 2011, to work at Salesforce.com as Senior Vice President of Strategic Planning. His role there includes the job title "Chief Futures Officer," where he leads a foresight and scenario planning team called Salesforce Futures.

References

External links
Peter Schwartz in Global Business Network
Peter Schwartz in Monitor Talent
Peter Schwartz in the Long Now
Peter Schwartz Author Profile

Living people
Futurologists
American people of Hungarian-Jewish descent
Rensselaer Polytechnic Institute alumni
Wired (magazine) people
1946 births
SRI International people
Center for a New American Security
Haddonfield Memorial High School alumni
People from Haddon Township, New Jersey
Writers from New Jersey